Telphusa alexandriacella is a moth of the family Gelechiidae. It is found in North America, where it has been recorded from Kentucky.

The forewings are grey, mottled with dark brown spots and with a few small white spots. An irregular white fascia, angulated in the middle towards the apex, crosses the wing at the beginning of the cilia. The apex is dark brown, with a row of small white spots around the base of the cilia, which themselves are pale luteous, dusted with dark brown. The hindwings pale fuscous.

References

Moths described in 1872
Telphusa